Lost Ocean is an American Christian rock band from Bakersfield, California, United States; they are currently Independent, but were signed to Credential Recordings until early 2009. They have released two EPs and a self-titled debut that was released on February 20, 2007. In January 2008, they went on the Northwest Winter Rock Tour with The Send and Ruth; and then later on the Credential Recordings Tour with other Credential bands in April 2008. 

The band started as a combination of two different bands that attended the same church (Riverlakes Church). Black, Johnson and Short were in a band called The Last Of Us with Jonny Buell and Lewis Conger. Gray had been in a band called the Curves. Buell left the Last of Us and the remaining members wanted to continue playing. Gray had finished playing with the Curves and joined in with the Last of Us under the new name Vow and Volition. Vow and Volition initially played frequently live as a post hardcore band attempting to fuse metal, punk and emo. The band had difficulty hiring a vocalist that could do the screaming and singing vocals Conger desired the band to have. Unable to find a good vocalist, the band began to have disagreements in the direction and style of music they would write.  Conger, the chief song writer at the time, was hard to work with and eventually left the band over musical differences and self admitted "immaturity." The band decided to continue and Gray stepped in as the vocalist and changed their name to Lost Ocean. The band began writing pop and rock material with Gray's voice excellently lending itself to the music. The band went on to small success and eventually a record contract.
   
In early 2009, it was announced that Lost Ocean had been dropped from Credential Recordings after their contract ran out. In June 2009, Lost Ocean released their first independent release called All Our Friends - EP. In November 2009, Lost Ocean released their second studio album, Could This Be Love?

Discography

Studio albums
 Douse the Choir – (2005)
 Lost Ocean – (February 20, 2007)
 Could This Be Love? – (November 6, 2009)

EPs
 Night to Life – (August 15, 2006)
 All Our Friends – (June 20, 2009)
 Out of Control (Found Demos) – (April 15, 2020)

Compilation appearances
 Stereocilia Vol. 1 (June 10, 2006)
 The Tour EP (January 23, 2007)

Further reading

External links
Official MySpace
Official PureVolume
Interview on AbsolutePunk.net

Christian rock groups from California
Credential Recordings artists
Musical groups established in 2004